The 1976–77 Austrian Hockey League season was the 47th season of the Austrian Hockey League, the top level of ice hockey in Austria. Seven teams participated in the league, and EC KAC won the championship.

Regular season

Playoffs

Semifinals
EC KAC - ECS Innsbruck 3:0 (9:1, 8:3, 6:1)
ATSE Graz - Wiener EV 3:0  (4:2, 5:3, 5:2)

Final
EC KAC - AYSE Graz 3:2 (6:3, 4:5 OT, 2:3, 2:1 OT, 4:2)

External links
Austrian Ice Hockey Association

Austria
Austrian Hockey League seasons
Aust